Vítor Manuel Ferreira Pereira (born 8 January 1985) is a Portuguese footballer who plays for SC Mirandela as a centre-back.

Club career
Pereira was born in Chaves, Vila Real District. He spent most of his career in the lower leagues of his country, appearing in the Segunda Liga for S.C. Freamunde (11 games in the 2007–08 season) and hometown club G.D. Chaves (two matches in the 2009–10 campaign, team relegation).

References

External links

1985 births
Living people
People from Chaves, Portugal
Sportspeople from Vila Real District
Portuguese footballers
Association football defenders
Liga Portugal 2 players
Segunda Divisão players
GD Bragança players
S.C. Freamunde players
G.D. Chaves players
C.D. Tondela players
SC Mirandela players
C.D.C. Montalegre players